This is a list of civil parishes in the ceremonial county of West Sussex, England. There are 156 civil parishes. Population figures are unavailable for some of the smallest parishes.
The former Shoreham by Sea Urban District, Crawley Urban District, Worthing Municipal Borough and Southwick Urban District are unparished. Parts of the former Horsham Urban District are unparished.

See also
 List of civil parishes in England

References

External links
 Office for National Statistics : Geographical Area Listings
 West Sussex County Council : Parish and Town Councils
 West Sussex County Council : 2001 Census : Population by Parish

Civil parishes
Sussex